Greenwood is an unincorporated community in Glenn County, California.

References

Unincorporated communities in California
Unincorporated communities in Glenn County, California